Hot Looks were posable 19  inch "fashion model" dolls made by Mattel from 1986 to 1988. The doll's bodies were made from stockinette and their heads were vinyl.  Each doll wore the clothing style of a country. The dolls in the series included:
Zizi from Kenya
Elkie from Sweden
Chelsea from England
Mimi from France
Stacey from the United States

Four dolls were released only in Canada. The second release came out in 1988 as a test run because the dolls did not become as popular as expected in the US. Those dolls were:
Starr from Hollywood
Sachi from Japan
Steff from Australia
Shawna from Scotland

1980s toys
Fashion dolls